Peprah is a surname. Notable people with the surname include

Charlie Peprah (born 1983), American football player
Richard Kwame Peprah, Ghanaian politician